Oliver! is a 1968 British period musical drama film based on Lionel Bart's 1960 stage musical of the same name, itself an adaptation of Charles Dickens's 1838 novel Oliver Twist. 

Directed by Carol Reed from a screenplay by Vernon Harris, the picture includes such musical numbers as "Food, Glorious Food", "Consider Yourself", "As Long as He Needs Me", "I'd Do Anything", "You've Got to Pick a Pocket or Two", and "Where Is Love?". 

It stars Ron Moody, Oliver Reed, Harry Secombe, Shani Wallis, Jack Wild, and Mark Lester in the title role. Filmed at Shepperton Film Studio in Surrey, it was a Romulus production by John Woolf and was distributed internationally by Columbia Pictures.

At the 41st Academy Awards for 1968, Oliver! was nominated for eleven Academy Awards and won six, including Best Picture, Best Director for Reed, and an Honorary Award for choreographer Onna White. At the 26th Golden Globe Awards, the film won two Golden Globes: Best Motion Picture – Musical or Comedy and Best Actor – Musical or Comedy for Ron Moody.

The British Film Institute ranked Oliver! the 77th greatest British film of the 20th century. In 2017, a poll of 150 actors, directors, writers, producers and critics for Time Out magazine ranked it the 69th best British film ever.

Plot

Act 1 
At a workhouse in Dunstable, orphans are served their daily gruel ("Food, Glorious Food"). A group of boys draw lots, with Oliver drawing the tangled one, forcing him to approach Mr. Bumble and the Widow Corney, and ask, "Please, sir, I have some more." Enraged, Bumble takes Oliver to the governors for punishment ("Oliver!") and then parades Oliver in the street to sell him off as an apprentice ("Boy for Sale"). Mr. Sowerberry, an undertaker, buys Oliver, but Sowerberry's other apprentice Noah Claypole bullies Oliver; when Oliver retaliates, Oliver is thrown first into a coffin and then into the cellar, where he laments his lack of a family ("Where Is Love?"). Suddenly, he discovers the window grate is unlocked; Oliver escapes.

Weeks later, Oliver reaches London. He meets the Artful Dodger, who instantly takes him under his wing ("Consider Yourself"). Dodger brings Oliver to a hideout for young pickpockets led by Fagin, who instructs the gang in the art of stealing ("You've Got to Pick a Pocket or Two"). Fagin later meets with Bill Sikes, a burglar, while Sikes's girlfriend Nancy joyfully remarks on low-class life ("It's a Fine Life"). When Fagin returns to his den, he goes through a secret cache of treasures. Oliver wakes up, notices Fagin's secret, and startles the man, who explains that the trove is to help him in his old age ("You've Got to Pick a Pocket or Two (Reprise)").

In the morning, Nancy and her friend Bet arrive at the hideout to collect Sikes's money. The boys mock Oliver for his good manners, which Nancy finds charming ("I'd Do Anything"). Fagin sends the boys out for the day, teaming Oliver with Dodger ("Be Back Soon"). At a bookstall, Dodger steals a wallet from Mr. Brownlow, who quickly mistakes Oliver for being the thief and has police arrest him. Fearing Oliver will rat out the gang, Fagin and Sikes send Nancy to court, where Oliver is too terrified to speak; fortunately, the bookseller Mr. Jessop, testifies that Oliver is innocent. Brownlow takes Oliver in, while Sikes and Fagin send Dodger to follow them, to Nancy's displeasure.

Act 2 
Oliver wakes up in Mr. Brownlow's luxurious house and happily watches from his balcony the merchants and inhabitants of Bloomsbury Square ("Who Will Buy"). Fagin and Sikes decide to abduct Oliver and bring him back to the den with Nancy's help. Nancy, who has come to care for Oliver, at first refuses to help, but Sikes physically abuses her, forcing her into obedience. In spite of this, Nancy still loves Sikes, and believes he reciprocates ("As Long as He Needs Me").

The next morning, Mr. Brownlow sends Oliver on an errand. Before he departs, Oliver notices a portrait painting of a beautiful young girl. Mr. Brownlow notes Oliver's resemblance to the girl (his niece, Emily, who disappeared years ago), and begins to suspect he may be Oliver's great-uncle. During the errand, Nancy and Sikes grab Oliver and bring him back to Fagin's den. A quarrel ensues over Oliver's future and who keeps the items that Mr. Brownlow entrusted to Oliver; Oliver's resistance goads Sikes into beating him, but Nancy stays Sikes's hand. Nancy remorsefully reviews their life, but Sikes maintains that any living is better than none. Fagin tries to soothe Sikes's temper, prompting Sikes to declare that if anyone ratted them out, Sikes will kill Fagin. Once Sikes and Nancy leave, Fagin considers abandoning his criminal life, but each imagined alternative proves just as untenable ("Reviewing the Situation").

Bumble and Corney pay a visit to Brownlow after he begins searching for Oliver's origin. They present a locket belonging to Oliver's mother, who arrived at the workhouse penniless and died during childbirth. Brownlow recognizes the locket as his niece's and throws the two out, enraged that they selfishly chose to keep the trinket and information to themselves until they could collect a reward for it. Meanwhile, in an attempt to introduce Oliver to a life of crime, Sikes forces Oliver to take part in a house robbery. The robbery fails when Oliver accidentally awakens the occupants, but he and Sikes get away. While Sikes and Oliver are gone, Nancy, fearful for Oliver's life, goes to Brownlow, confessing her part in Oliver's kidnapping, but doesn't state the name of Fagin or Bill Sikes for her own protection. Promising to return him to Brownlow at midnight at London Bridge, Nancy heads for the tavern. When Sikes and Oliver appear, Sikes orders his dog Bullseye to guard the boy. Nancy starts up a lively drinking song, hoping that the noise will distract Sikes. Bullseye, however, alerts Sikes, who gives chase.

As Oliver and Nancy share a farewell embrace at London Bridge, Sikes catches up and grabs both of them and throws Oliver aside. Nancy then tries to pull Sikes away, angering him into dragging her behind the staircase of London Bridge and violently bludgeoning her, injuring her fatally. Sikes then takes off with Oliver, but Bullseye returns to the scene where Nancy has succumbed to her injuries and alerts the police. The dog leads Brownlow and an angry mob to the thieves' hideout. Sikes arrives at Fagin's den and demands money, revealing that he killed Nancy as well. Upon seeing the approaching mob, the thieves disband and flee. Sikes runs off with Oliver, using him as a hostage. During the evacuation, Fagin loses his prized possessions, which sink into mud. Sikes attempts to flee to an adjacent roof, but is shot dead in the process by the police. Fagin makes up his mind to change his ways for good, but just as he is about to walk away a reformed character, Dodger appears from nowhere with a wallet he stole earlier. They dance off into the sunrise together, happily determined to live out the rest of their days as thieves, while Oliver returns to Brownlow's home for good.

Cast

Production

Casting 
The film used mostly young unknowns, among them Mark Lester (Oliver), Shani Wallis (Nancy) and Jack Wild as The Artful Dodger, but also featured Hugh Griffith, an Oscar winner for Ben-Hur, in the role of the Magistrate. Harry Secombe, who played Mr. Bumble, was well known in Britain but not in the United States, and Oliver Reed, who played Bill Sikes, had just begun to make a name for himself. Producer John Woolf suggested Oliver Reed for the role to the director Carol Reed, without knowing that the two were, in fact, related as nephew and uncle respectively. Many felt that the role of Nancy should have gone to Georgia Brown, who had played the role in the West End production. Classical actor Joseph O'Conor, not well known in the U.S., played Mr. Brownlow.

Ron Moody later told an interviewer that when it was first proposed that he play Fagin, he felt that character was “pretty vicious and unpleasant; I didn’t want to do that. I didn’t want to perpetuate what I considered to be an unfair, unpleasant image of Jewish people.” He came to realize that “that the only way to play Fagin was to forget Dickens and create a clown and I used every trick I could think of to take Fagin away from Dickens’ concept and to bring it into more of an entertainment situation.”

Filming at Shepperton Studios commenced on 23 June 1967.

Music

Reception

Box office
The film earned $10.5 million in theatrical rentals at the US and Canadian box office. and took $77,402,877 worldwide. In the United Kingdom, the film played for 90 weeks at the Leicester Square Theatre in London, grossing $1,992,000. It had been seen by 5 million people across the country at that time.

Critical response

Oliver! received widespread acclaim from critics. It was hailed by Pauline Kael in her review published in The New Yorker as being one of the few film versions of a stage musical that was superior to the original show, which she suggested she had walked out on. "The musical numbers emerge from the story with a grace that has been rarely seen since the musicals of René Clair."

Roger Ebert of the Chicago Sun-Times awarded the film four out of four stars. "Sir Carol Reed's Oliver! is a treasure of a movie," he wrote. "It is very nearly universal entertainment, one of those rare films like The Wizard of Oz that appeals in many ways to all sorts of people. It will be immediately exciting to the children, I think, because of the story and the unforgettable Dickens characters. Adults will like it for the sweep and zest of its production. And as a work of popular art, it will stand the test of time, I guess. It is as well-made as a film can be." He particularly admired Carol Reed's working relationship with the children in the film: "Not for a moment, I suspect, did Reed imagine he had to talk down to the children in his audience. Not for a moment are the children in the cast treated as children. They're equal participants in the great adventure, and they have to fend for themselves or bloody well get out of the way. This isn't a watered-down lollypop. It's got bite and malice along with...romance and humor." Although he stated that the film's roadshow presentation was a minor problem for children, who are not used to long films, he praised the production design, musical adaptation score, and casting and acting, particularly that of Ron Moody and Jack Wild. He concluded, "Oliver! succeeds finally because of its taste. It never stoops for cheap effects and never insults our intelligence. And because we can trust it, we can let ourselves go with it, and we do. It is a splendid experience." He later named the film as the seventh best film of 1968.

John Simon wrote 'Oliver is a nice, big movie musical which it is hard to say anything of special interest to the reader or even to oneself'.

The Philadelphia Inquirer was enthusiastic: "There's atmosphere and airy grace to 'Oliver!.' It has catchy, sometimes beautiful songs and the voices to go with them. It rarely stops moving and it has the touch of melodramatic excitement....a prancing musical film which by reason of its stagecraft and performance is more exhilarating than it was on the stage, better rounded in its 'free' adaptation."

Rotten Tomatoes awards the film a 90% "fresh" rating based on 77 reviews, with an average score of 8/10; the critics' consensus reads: "Oliver! transforms Charles Dickens’ muckraking novel into a jaunty musical Victorian fairytale, buoyed by Ron Moody’s charming star turn and Onna White’s rapturous choreography."

At his death in 2015, The Forward said that Moody succeeded in transforming "a viciously anti-Semitic literary portrait into a joyous musical onscreen image."

Accolades 
Oliver!, along with Columbia Pictures' other Best Picture nominee Funny Girl, secured a combined total of 19 Academy Award nominations, the most nominations for musicals from one studio in a year.

Oliver! was the last G-rated film to win the Academy Award for Best Picture. It was the last movie musical to win the award, until Chicago in 2002 (there have been other musicals nominated such as Hello, Dolly!, Fiddler on the Roof, Cabaret, All That Jazz, Beauty and the Beast and Moulin Rouge!). Oliver! also had the distinction of being the last British film to win Best Picture until Chariots of Fire in 1981.

Preservation 
The Academy Film Archive preserved Oliver! in 1998.

Home video
Commencing in the US in 1998, Oliver! has been released worldwide on DVD by Columbia Tristar Home Entertainment and its successor Sony Pictures Home Entertainment. The US DVD has the film, complete with its original overture and entr'acte music, spread across two sides of a double-sided disc, separated at the intermission. Everywhere else, it was issued on a single-sided disc. Since 2013, it has been released on Blu-ray in several countries by Sony, with the US having an additional limited edition release by Twilight Time.

References

External links 
 
 
 
 
 
 

1960s musical drama films
1968 drama films
1968 films
American films based on plays
1960s English-language films
Best Musical or Comedy Picture Golden Globe winners
Best Picture Academy Award winners
British films based on plays
British musical drama films
Columbia Pictures films
Films awarded an Academy Honorary Award
Films based on musicals
Films based on Oliver Twist
Films directed by Carol Reed
Films featuring a Best Musical or Comedy Actor Golden Globe winning performance
Films scored by Johnny Green
Films set in England
Films set in the 19th century
Films that won the Best Original Score Academy Award
Films that won the Best Sound Mixing Academy Award
Films shot at Shepperton Studios
Films based on adaptations
Films whose art director won the Best Art Direction Academy Award
Films whose director won the Best Directing Academy Award
1960s British films